Nebojša Grujić (born 21 March 1991) is a Serbian sprint canoer.

He won a gold medal in the K-2 200 m event at the 2014 World Championship in Moscow.

References

Biography at Digicorp.hu

External links

1991 births
Living people
Sportspeople from Šabac
Serbian male canoeists
European Games medalists in canoeing
European Games gold medalists for Serbia
Canoeists at the 2015 European Games
Canoeists at the 2016 Summer Olympics
Olympic canoeists of Serbia
European champions for Serbia
ICF Canoe Sprint World Championships medalists in kayak